Hoseynabad-e Jangal may refer to:
 Hoseynabad-e Jangal, Razavi Khorasan